Indie folk is a music genre that arose in the 1990s among musicians from indie rock scenes influenced by folk music. Indie folk hybridizes the acoustic guitar melodies of traditional folk music with contemporary instrumentation.

The genre has its earliest origins in 1990s folk artists who displayed alternative rock influences in their music, such as Ani DiFranco and Dan Bern, and acoustic artists such as Elliott Smith and Will Oldham. In the following decade, labels such as Saddle Creek, Barsuk, Ramseur, and Sub Pop helped to provide support to indie folk, with artists such as Fleet Foxes breaking into the pop charts with albums such as Helplessness Blues.

In the United Kingdom, artists such as Ben Howard and Mumford & Sons emerged, with the latter band promoting the music style through their Gentlemen of the Road touring festivals. The success of acts like Mumford & Sons led some music journalists like Popjustice's Peter Robinson labelling this new British music scene as The New Boring or Beige Pop.

In the late 2010s, artists such as Phoebe Bridgers and Julien Baker revived interest in the genre. Bridgers cites Elliott Smith as a foundational influence on her sound.

References

Alternative rock genres
American styles of music
British styles of music
British rock music genres
 
Indie rock